David Benjamin Lat (born June 19, 1975) is an American lawyer, author, and legal commentator. Lat is the founder of Above the Law, a website about law firms and the legal profession.

Before blogging, Lat attended Harvard College and Yale Law School. After law school, he worked as a law clerk for a federal appeals judge (Diarmuid F. O'Scannlain), an associate at Wachtell Lipton Rosen & Katz, and an Assistant U.S. Attorney for the appeals division in the District of New Jersey.

Lat first began blogging anonymously for the judicial gossip blog "Underneath Their Robes," until he revealed his identity in a November 2005 interview with Jeffrey Toobin of The New Yorker. Shortly thereafter, Lat launched Above the Law, a website featuring news about law firms and the legal profession and legal gossip. In December 2014, Lat published his debut novel, Supreme Ambitions.

As of May 2021, Lat's main writing outlet is his Substack newsletter, Original Jurisdiction, which he describes as his "primary source of income."

Early life and education
David Lat is the son of Filipino doctors. He was born in Queens, New York.  He grew up in Bergenfield, New Jersey, and Saddle River, New Jersey. While living in Saddle River, his neighbors included former President Richard M. Nixon. On Halloween, he would get a Halloween card and a handshake from the former president. Lat attended Regis High School in Manhattan, New York. Lat  won the Villiger Tournament for extemporaneous speaking in Philadelphia, Pennsylvania.

He attended Harvard College in Cambridge, Massachusetts, where he studied English, wrote dozens of columns for the Harvard Crimson, and was a member of the Harvard Speech and Parliamentary Debate Society. He earned a Bachelor of Arts magna cum laude and was elected to Phi Beta Kappa, graduating in 1996.

He attended Yale Law School, where he was vice president of the Federalist Society. Lat was a member of the Yale Law Journal, where he was a Book Reviews Editor.

Legal career
After law school, he went on to work as a judicial law clerk for a federal appeals court judge in Portland, Diarmuid F. O'Scannlain, during the 1999–2000 judicial year. After his clerkship, he went on to a job at the Manhattan firm Wachtell Lipton Rosen & Katz. While at Wachtell, he worked on a fight over insurance payments for the World Trade Center on behalf of Wachtell's client Larry Silverstein. One Wachtell partner noted that he seemed very unhappy in the drudgery of litigation.

After leaving Wachtell, Lat took a job in the appeals division of the United States Attorney for the District of New Jersey, and twice argued before Justice Samuel Alito in the Court of Appeals for the Third Circuit. When his blogging became public, he met with then-U.S. Attorney Chris Christie, who praised his blog. At the end of 2005, Lat left his job at the U.S. Attorney's office. He reported that the resignation was his own choice, though his supervisor encouraged him to take any blogging opportunities afforded by his new celebrity.

Blogging

Underneath Their Robes 
In June 2004, Lat anonymously started the website Underneath Their Robes (UTR), a gossip blog about the federal judiciary, under the pseudonym Article III Groupie, also known as A3G. While Lat mentioned his background as a former federal judicial clerk from a top law school, he gave the readers the impression that the author was a female lawyer at a large law firm. The blog became widely popular when it conducted a poll on the "Superhotties of the Federal Judiciary", and several federal judges, including Alex Kozinski and Richard Posner, corresponded with Article III Groupie. The blog interviewed several judges and gained national media coverage in the wake of the 2005 United States Supreme Court nominations of John Roberts, Harriet Miers, and Samuel Alito. The blog also served as a clearinghouse for news and gossip about clerks for the Supreme Court, whom A3G called "the Elect."

In November 2005, Lat revealed A3G's identity in an interview with Jeffrey Toobin for the magazine The New Yorker. Lat said that "[t]he blog really reflects two aspects of my personality, I am very interested in serious legal issues as well as in fun and frivolous and gossipy issues. I can go from the Harvard Law Review to Us Weekly very quickly." After leaving the U.S. Attorney's office in January 2006, Lat became an editor of Washington, D.C. blog Wonkette (at the time, part of the Gawker Media network), formerly run by Ana Marie Cox.

Above the Law 
In June 2006, Lat announced his decision to leave Wonkette in order to form a legal gossip blog with Dealbreaker's Elizabeth Spiers. In August 2006, this blog was founded as 'Above the Law'. In July 2008, he became the managing editor of Breaking Media, overseeing its stable of blogs out of its New York office. In December 2009, Lat announced that he would be returning to full-time writing and editing of Above the Law, after a new CEO and executive editor joined Breaking Media.

In 2012 Lat "broke the news that one of most prestigious law firms in the world, Dewey & LeBoeuf, which employed more than 1,300 attorneys in 12 countries in 2007, was on the verge of imploding." Business Insider named Lat one of the 20 biggest legal stars on Twitter, calling his Twitter feed a "treasure trove of law firm gossip, employment trends, stupid law student antics, and pretty much anything else concerning the legal industry."

In May 2019, Lat left Above the Law to become a managing director of the legal recruiting firm Lateral Link, although he continues to write biweekly columns for the website.

Original Jurisdiction 
In December 2020, Lat launched Original Jurisdiction, a newsletter/website about law and the legal profession on the Substack platform, with an interview of prominent litigator David Boies as his first story. In May 2021, Lat left Lateral Link and legal recruiting and returned to full-time writing, with Original Jurisdiction as his primary outlet. Paid subscriptions to Original Jurisdiction now represent his primary source of income.

Author and writing
Lat's writing has also appeared in various newspapers and magazines, including The New York Times, The Wall Street Journal, The Washington Post, The Los Angeles Times, Slate, New York Magazine, The New York Observer, and Washingtonian.

In 2014, Lat published his first novel, Supreme Ambitions, to favorable reviews. The novel details the rise of Audrey Coyne, a recent Yale Law School graduate who dreams of clerking for the U.S. Supreme Court, mirroring Lat's own former ambitions. After graduating from YLS, Audrey moves to the West Coast to clerk for a highly regarded appeals-court judge. According to a reviewer in The New York Times, "for an elite niche — consisting largely of federal judges and their clerks — Supreme Ambitions has become the most buzzed-about novel of the year."

Personal life
Lat is gay. He is married to fellow lawyer Zachary Baron Shemtob. They were married by Judge J. Paul Oetken. Their son was born in October 2017 through a gestational surrogate. Lat has run the New York City Marathon twice, most recently in 2007, with a finishing time of 4:43:27. He walks about 25 miles a week and engages in interval training regularly.

On March 17, 2020, Lat announced he was infected with COVID-19. He was listed in critical condition, intubated in a hospital in New York City as of March 20, but his condition improved substantially by March 28. He was discharged from NYU Langone on April 1. On April 6, 2020, he was interviewed on the Today show and The Rachel Maddow Show about his experience.

Lat lives in Summit, New Jersey.

Notes

References

External links

Above the Law

1975 births
Living people
20th-century American lawyers
21st-century American lawyers
American bloggers
American fiction writers
American jurists of Filipino descent
American male journalists
American online journalists
American online publication editors
American prosecutors
Federalist Society members
American gay writers
American gossip columnists
The Harvard Crimson people
Harvard College alumni
American LGBT journalists
LGBT people from New Jersey
American LGBT people of Asian descent
People from Bergenfield, New Jersey
People from Saddle River, New Jersey
Regis High School (New York City) alumni
Yale Law School alumni
21st-century American non-fiction writers
American male bloggers
Wachtell, Lipton, Rosen & Katz people
21st-century LGBT people